Start Something is the second studio album by the Welsh rock band Lostprophets, released on 2 February 2004 through Visible Noise in the United Kingdom and South Korea. The album was released internationally on 5 February 2004. The band began work on the album in 2003 after touring for support of their previous album, The Fake Sound of Progress. This is the second and last album featuring the original drummer Mike Chiplin.

Start Something was a critical and commercial success and became the band's international breakthrough album. It peaked at number 33 on the Billboard 200 selling over 500 thousand copies in the United States alone and reached high positions on charts worldwide. Six singles were released from the album: "Burn Burn", "Last Train Home", "Wake Up (Make a Move)", "Last Summer", "Goodbye Tonight" and the radio single "I Don't Know". These singles helped Lostprophets reach mainstream popularity. In 2004, the album was certified platinum by the BPI in the United Kingdom, and gold in the United States by the RIAA.

Recording 
The album was produced by Eric Valentine who has also produced albums by Queens of the Stone Age and Good Charlotte. MTV reports that the band chose the album name for two reasons. Firstly, the band wanted to motivate people they had met who stated that they would "love to do this and that" but never had the drive to do it. The second being that the band viewed Start Something as their first "musical step", as they felt The Fake Sound of Progress, originally intended as only a demo, "did not accurately reflect their ability".

Lostprophets cancelled their show at Reading and Leeds Festival in 2003 to continue their work on the album. Lead singer Ian Watkins said they did it because "We want to make the best record possible and did not want to rush anything" and continued with "unfortunately these shows are at the final stages of making the record and we felt it was more important." The Scottish rock band Biffy Clyro replaced Lostprophets at the festival.

Billy Martin and Benji Madden of Good Charlotte appear in additional vocals on "Last Train Home".

Artwork

The album cover, designed by Ian Watkins and Jamie Oliver, features a new gothic style logo with German blackletter typeface, replacing the old logo used for Fake Sound of Progress. It would in itself be replaced for the band's next album, but featured on several of the band's singles taken from this album. Sometimes the lyrics "but even through your doubts, we will still be here", taken from "We Still Kill The Old Way", are written below the logo. The figure at the front of the artwork wears blue jeans, a black hoodie and a baseball cap and is meant to resemble Watkins, however, the person actually depicted in the photograph is Justin Timberlake.

At the time, Oliver was also an acclaimed artist with his work being displayed in exhibitions depicting Rhondda life. There are slight variations with the cover in different territories with some showing the shadow of the figure with wings - either angels wings or more likely bird wings. This is best depicted in an official promotional colour wallpaper the band released for fans. The city in the album's background is Los Angeles, California where the album was recorded and mixed. Watkins said that he regarded artwork as "just as important as the music", and in January 2010 reflected back on some of the Lostprophets' artwork saying "I remember doing the Start Something record and compiling the inlay which is a collage of two years of our lives. It was so much fun. I'd sit there for hours looking at the booklet and all the little pictures. I did that to all the albums I bought."

The album was titled Start Something for two reasons. Firstly it was meant to motivate people out of complacency with Watkins saying "We spent the last three years touring and meeting loads of people who were like, 'I'd love to do this and that', but they never had the drive to get up off their asses and do it. Start something. Start anything." Secondly it stood in contrast to their first album which was meant to be just a demo and thus the band saw this album as their first musical step and the first to accurately reflect their ability.

Release history 

The album was met with much attention in the UK and the US, thanks to the three first singles from the album: "Burn Burn", "Last Train Home" and "Wake Up (Make a Move)", which all met with high chart positions in the UK, US and in mainland Europe. The album was certified Silver and Gold by the BPI on 20 February 2004 and certified Platinum on 14 January 2005. According to the Recording Industry Association of America (RIAA), the album has sold more than 500,000 copies in the United States, earning a Gold certification. The album has sold 2.5 million copies worldwide according to the British Broadcasting Corporation (BBC).

In the mids of February 2004, Start Something reached its peak at #33 on the Billboard 200 which was the band's highest charting position in the United States at the time. The album also reached #33 on the Billboard Comprehensive Albums chart in the United States. The album first charted on the UK Albums Chart at #4 in 2004, in 2005 it peaked at its peak position #93 and after the release of Liberation Transmission in 2006 the album re-charted and peaked at #133.

Two singles were released from the album. The first single was "Burn Burn, which peaked at #17 on the UK Singles Chart. The single later re-charted in 2004 and peaked at #110, becoming the first Lostprophets single to chart in Oceania and mainland Europe. The follow-up single "Last Train Home" peaked at #8 on the UK Singles chart and #1 on the US Hot Modern Rock Tracks chart, #10 on the Hot Mainstream Rock Tracks chart, and #75 on the Billboard Hot 100. "Wake Up (Make a Move)" peaked at #18 in the UK, #9 on the Hot Modern Rock Tracks chart, and #16 on the Hot Mainstream Rock Tracks chart. "Goodbye Tonight" and "Last Summer" peaked in the UK at #42 and #13 respectively.  "I Don't Know", released to American radio on 26 October 2004, peaked at #11 on the Hot Modern Rock Tracks chart and #24 on the Hot Mainstream Rock Tracks chart.

Reception

The album gained generally favorable reviews from music critics, At Metacritic, which assigns a normalized rating out of 100 to reviews from mainstream critics, the album has received an average score of 70, based on 13 reviews.

Johnny Loftus from Allmusic said that they had too big of a resemblance to bands such as Linkin Park, Incubus, and Faith No More; Loftus gave the album 2 out of 5 stars.

Rolling Stone reviewer Kirk Miller was more positive to the album and called it a "kick-ass tribute" again because of its resemblance to American rock band Faith No More and gave the album 3 out of 5 stars. Justin Kownacki from Splendid said "this is one of those finely-polished discs that should have no trouble finding a huge audience" and was more over positive to the album.

Drowned in Sound reviewer Gen Williams said "It's a really really really really really REALLY great pop-metal explosion." and continued to say "Burn Burn" boasted "the catchiest hook this side of Linkin Park" and that the alleged Adamski rip-off was justified because of the song's quality, and giving the album 8 out of 10 stars.

Q called it "Unashamedly Epic." NME said "This is something genuinely fresh... here friends, is the real sound of progress (reference to the band's previous effort, The Fake Sound of Progress)" and Observer Music Monthly credited Start Something on being "A hybrid of big rock choruses, powerful rhythms and a neat pop edge to their rock artillery."  Entertainment Weekly gave the album a B and said that Lostprophets "mostly live up to that high standard by juxtaposing gnarly metal riffs with quirky electronic interludes. Only the occasional lapse into Linkin Park-style self-indulgence drags them down."

It was ranked seventh in Kerrang! magazine's Albums of the Year 2004 list. In a readers poll titled Top 100 British Rock Albums the album was ranked eighteenth, and was the third highest of the 2000s, however the poll was taken in February 2005 whilst the album was still fresh in the mind for many.

In 2005, Start Something was ranked number 364 in Rock Hard magazine's book The 500 Greatest Rock & Metal Albums of All Time. Rock Sound magazine ranked the album eighth on their Critics' Poll 2004, the highest placing for a British band.

Tour 
The first time songs from the new album were played live was on 17 August 2003 at Newport, the first gig of three alongside a Birmingham date and a Manchester date, in preparation for the Reading and Leeds festival at the end of August. For these gigs, "We Still Kill the Old Way" became the regular opener, whilst sets closed with "Burn Burn", with tracks from their previous album interspersed in between. Kerrang noted in a live review from Manchester that "We Still Kill the Old Way" and "To Hell We Ride" were "well received" but that "the surfeit of new material leads to a comparatively muted response". At the end of July though it was announced that the band had cancelled their appearance at Reading and Leeds, whilst still promising to play the three warm-up shows, citing that they wanted the recording of Start Something to take precedence. Ian Watkins said "Unfortunately these shows are at the final stages of making the record and we felt it was more important not to short change anyone." The band did however support Linkin Park at Wembley Arena in London on 22 November 2003 playing eight tracks, including five from the soon to be released new album. Therefore, the band played four dates altogether in 2003.

To promote the album, the band toured North America, Europe, Asia and Oceania. Four months before the release of Start Something the band started the support tour for it. Their tour started in the United Kingdom. The band also announced being Linkin Park's support act in their UK winter arena tour. They later announced playing at the NME Award show in the London Astoria and then later announced UK dates in such places as Glasgow, Newcastle and Manchester among others. The concert in the London Astoria ended up being sold out.

On 15 July Lostprophets started their North America tour which included thirteen dates all put together, the American tour ended on 3 August 2004. Lostprophets would also go on to be a part of the MTV's Campus Invasion Tour, the band was a supporting act for headliner Hoobastank, the tour kicked of in University of Tennessee. In May 2004 the band visited Vancouver, British Columbia, Canada for a one night show. Later on they went to play in New Zealand and Australia as part of the Big Day Out festival. They would also go down to Japan for their first time. The band returned to the UK in November 2004 and for the first time they played big headline dates, because of this they extended their UK tour.

As of 2012, Start Something is the most popular album played by the band with just over 35% of songs coming from that album across all the gigs they've ever played. On top of this "Last Train Home", "Burn Burn" and "Last Summer" are amongst the most popular songs the band play live. With the exception of "I Don't Know", "Hello Again" and "A Million Miles", the other tracks all featured at least a couple of times during The Betrayed tour of 2010 and the Weapons tour of 2012. Apart from once when the whole album was played in its entirety to a sell-out crowd at Cardiff's Motorpoint Arena on 28 April 2012, the last time "I Don't Know" was played live was in 2008, whilst Hello Again and A Million Miles were last played in 2004. Recently British fans have regularly asked the band to play "We Are Godzilla, You Are Japan" by making a claw shape with their left hand and chanting "Godzilla!". The band sometimes tease the audience by playing the first few notes but very rarely play the song in full.

Legacy

In June 2012 the album was entered into Rock Sound magazine's Hall of Fame with features on how the band look back on the album and how it has influenced others. Rock Sound said that the album made the band into "one of our greatest rock commodities" and called it a "defining record for the UK rock scene as a whole". Lee Gaze stated "Start Something is the greatest hits of what Lostprophets do". Aled Phillips of Kids in Glass Houses said "it was a turning point for a lot of bands" but also that "everyone's jeans got tighter and started wearing Nike Dunks - it was a cultural shift. With them it was never just about the music, everybody got swept up in the whole aesthetic as well". Five British rock records - All Our Kings Are Dead, We Are the Dynamite, World Record, Free and Hold Me Down - were all cited as being heavily influenced by Start Something.

Also in 2012 the band announced a homecoming show at Cardiff's Motorpoint Arena where the album was played in its entirety. Stuart Richardson said "We wrote the record in Caerphilly. Start Something is when we kind of came into our own as a band, and Cardiff is where we came into our own as people". The gig sold out with a crowd of 10,000 people.

BBC Wales called the album a "modern rock classic" in retrospect and BBC Music called it a "UK rock classic". Whilst WalesOnline noted how the album had been "a galvanising force in the Welsh rock scene". The BBC also produced a radio programme with Bethan Elfyn that aired on BBC Radio 1 in May 2010, which featured the Stereophonics, Manic Street Preachers, Funeral for a Friend and The Blackout amongst others, and titled it "Start Something: The Story of South Wales Rock" in honour of the album. The album was included in Rock Sounds 101 Modern Classics list at number 14.

As of May 2012 the album has garnered 10.8 million plays by 640,000 listeners on Last.FM.

Awards
Kerrang! Awards

|-
| 2004 || Start Something || Best Album || 
|-
| 2004 || Last Train Home || Best Single || 

Metal Hammer Awards

|-
| 2004 || Lostprophets for Start Something tour || Best Live Act ||

Accolades

(*) designates unordered lists.

Track listing
All lyrics written by Ian Watkins, all music composed by Lostprophets.

Personnel
Credits for Start Something adapted from liner notes.

Lostprophets
 Ian Watkins - lead vocals, art direction
 Lee Gaze – lead guitar
 Mike Lewis – rhythm guitar
 Stuart Richardson - bass guitar
 Jamie Oliver – synth, turntables, samples, vocals, illustration
 Mike Chiplin - drums, percussion
Additional musicians
 David Campbell – string arrangement
 Billy Martin – backing vocals
 Benji Madden – backing vocals
 Brett Allen Rentals – additional guitars

Production

 Eric Valentine – production, engineered, mixing
 Kevin Augunas – engineered, backing vocals
 Joe Barresi – additional engineered
 Trevor Whatever – studio manager
 Steve Turzo – studio assistant, backing vocals
 Jeff Turzo – sequence
 DMT rentals – additional digital recording
 Brian Gardner – mastered
 Q Prime Inc. – management
 Doug Mark – legal
 Mike Dewdney – booking
 Julie Weir – Visible Noise A&R
 Greg Boggs – Columbia A&R
 Gerard Babitts – Columbia A&R
 Martin Greene Ravden – business management
 Flood – business management
 Bumstead – business management
 McCready – business management
 McCarthy – business management
 Dan Mandell – art direction
 Chapman Baehler – photography
 Lawrence Watson – photography

Charts

Certifications

References

External links

Start Something at YouTube (streamed copy where licensed)
Band web page
[ Allmusic]
MTV News Article

2004 albums
Lostprophets albums
Columbia Records albums
Albums produced by Eric Valentine
Nu metal albums by British artists